These are the squads for the countries that played in the 1975 Copa América. The first round was played in three groups of three teams with Uruguay, receiving a bye to the semi finals.

Group A

Argentina 
Head Coach: César Luis Menotti

Brazil 
Head Coach: Osvaldo Brandão

Venezuela 
Head Coach:

Group B

Bolivia 

Coach:

Chile 
Head Coach: Pedro Morales

Peru 
Head Coach: Marcos Calderón

Group C

Colombia 
Head Coach: Efraín Sánchez

Ecuador 
Head Coach:  Roque Máspoli

Paraguay 
Head Coach:

Semi-final

Uruguay 
Head Coach: Juan Alberto Schiaffino

References

Squads
1975 in sports
Copa América squads